Elisio Batista da Conceição Júnior (born 11 April 1993), known as Júnior Batista, is a Brazilian footballer who plays as a attacker for Gangneung City FC.

Career

Batista started his career with Brazilian sixth division side Atlântico, helping them earn promotion to the Brazilian fifth division,

In 2017, he signed for Ceilândia in the Brazilian fourth division. After that, Batista signed for Portuguese fourth division club GDSC Alvarenga.

In 2018, he signed for Richmond in the Australian fourth division. After that, Batista signed for Gozitan team Għarb Rangers.

In 2020, Batista signed for Ferroviário (CE) in the Brazilian third division after playing for Portuguese fourth division outfit Moura, where he made 13 league appearances and scored 1 goal.

Before the second half of 2020–21, he signed for Cape Town Spurs in the South African second division.

References

External links
 Júnior Batista at ZeroZero
 
 Júnior Batista at playmakerstats.com

 
1993 births
Living people
Brazilian footballers
Brazilian expatriate footballers 
Sportspeople from Salvador, Bahia
Association football forwards
Richmond SC players
Ceilândia Esporte Clube players
Cape Town Spurs F.C. players
Elosport Capão Bonito players
Real Estelí F.C. players
Gangneung City FC players
National First Division players
Ferroviário Atlético Clube (CE) players
Campeonato Brasileiro Série C players
Campeonato Brasileiro Série D players
Gozo Football League First Division players
Brazilian expatriate sportspeople in Australia
Brazilian expatriate sportspeople in South Africa
Brazilian expatriate sportspeople in Portugal
Brazilian expatriate sportspeople in Malta
Brazilian expatriate sportspeople in Nicaragua
Brazilian expatriate sportspeople in South Korea
Expatriate soccer players in South Africa
Expatriate footballers in Portugal 
Expatriate footballers in Malta 
Expatriate soccer players in Australia 
Expatriate footballers in Nicaragua
Expatriate footballers in South Korea